Sultan Ali Lakhani is a Pakistani businessman and former senator who is the co-founder of the Lakson Group and owner of McDonald's Pakistan. He was a member of the Senate of Pakistan from March 1988 to March 1994.

Early life
He is an ethnic Gujrati and was born on 24 July 1948 in Gondia, Maharashtra, India. He holds a degree in economics from the University of Karachi.

Career

Political career
He was elected to the Senate of Pakistan as a candidate of Pakistan Muslim League on the general seat from Sindh. He was a member of the Senate between March 1988 and March 1994.

He was arrested in 2000 on the orders of National Accountability Bureau (Pakistan) for alleged loan defaults and being a business partner of Hassan Nawaz, son of the former Prime Minister, Nawaz Sharif. They co-owned fast-food chain McDonald's (Pakistan). They were arrested for failing to pay back loans they had taken from various banks.

Business career
Lakhani is also the owner of Lakson Group and was the Honorary Consul of Mexico in Karachi.

Awards and recognition
In 2012, Lakhani received the Hilal-i-Imtiaz (Crescent of Excellence) conferred by then President of Pakistan Asif Ali Zardari.

References 

1948 births
Living people
Lakson Group
Pakistani mass media owners
Pakistani newspaper publishers (people)
Pakistani industrialists
Pakistani prisoners and detainees
Members of the Senate of Pakistan
University of Karachi alumni
Businesspeople from Karachi
Pakistan Muslim League politicians
Recipients of Hilal-i-Imtiaz
People from Gondia
Pakistanis named in the Pandora Papers